Charles Frederick William Hime (24 October 1869 – 6 December 1940) was a South African cricketer who played in one Test in 1896.

Biography
Hime was the son of Albert Henry Hime of the Royal Engineers, who was building an important causeway in Bermuda at the time of Charles's birth. After the completion of the causeway Albert Hime and his family moved to South Africa, where he served as Premier of Natal from 1899 to 1903.

Hime scored 58 (his highest first-class score and the highest score in the match) and 29 when Natal defeated Transvaal by seven runs in the Currie Cup in 1893–94. He did reasonably well with bat and ball in the matches Pietermaritzburg and Natal played against the touring Lord Hawke's XI in January 1896, but was less successful when selected in the South African team for the First Test shortly afterwards – although his eight runs made him the second-highest scorer in South Africa's second innings of 30. He captained Natal in his final first-class match in 1905–06 against the touring MCC and took his best figures of 5 for 18.

He married Kathleen Shores in England in 1898. They had four children.

See also
 List of Test cricketers born in non-Test playing nations

References

External links
 Charles Hime at Cricket Archive
 Charles Hime at Cricinfo

1869 births
1940 deaths
South Africa Test cricketers
South African cricketers
KwaZulu-Natal cricketers
Alumni of Maritzburg College